Du Long (born 17 February 1964) is a Chinese sport shooter who competed in the 1992 Summer Olympics.

References

1964 births
Living people
Chinese male sport shooters
ISSF rifle shooters
Olympic shooters of China
Shooters at the 1992 Summer Olympics
Shooters at the 1994 Asian Games
Asian Games medalists in shooting
Place of birth missing (living people)
Asian Games bronze medalists for China
Medalists at the 1994 Asian Games
20th-century Chinese people